Swedish Sign Language (SSL) is the sign language used in Sweden. It is recognized by the Swedish government as the country's official sign language, and hearing parents of deaf individuals are entitled to access state-sponsored classes that facilitate their learning of SSL. There are fewer than 10,000 speakers, making the language officially endangered.

History 

Swedish sign language first came into use in 1800. It does not stem from any other languages. In fact, this self-created language went on to influence Finnish Sign Language and Portuguese Sign Language. 1809 marks the year of the first deaf school, Manillaskolan, in Sweden. It was not until 1981 that Swedish Sign Language was recognized as a national language of Sweden.

Handshapes 
Many of the handshapes used in fingerspelling in Swedish Sign Language are similar to those in American Sign Language, even though the two languages are not related. For example, D is the same as B in ASL, G is the same as S in ASL, H is the same as F in ASL, I is the same in ASL, K is the same in ASL, M and N are very similar in ASL, O is the same in ASL, S is the same as C in ASL, and U, V & W are the same in ASL (but with a different palm orientation).

Education and communication 
Per the Education Act of 1998, deaf children are expected to be able to write in Swedish and English, in addition to expressing their thoughts in Swedish Sign Language. Thus, six state-run schools (one of which specializes in learning disabilities) have been established regionally for deaf children who cannot attend traditional comprehensive schools. Comprehensive and secondary schools in Sweden offer classes in addition to a one-year program to students to learn Swedish Sign Language as a third national language, as well as in hopes of becoming an interpreter. Interpreters are found in hospitals, and they also teach the language to the parents and siblings of deaf children. Sweden provides 240 hours of courses over four years to parents so that they may learn to communicate with their children. Additionally, weekly courses in the language are also available to the siblings of deaf children and the children of deaf parents.

Expanding the culture of the deaf 
Since the recognition of Swedish Sign Language as a national language of Sweden, the Swedish government has made available to deaf individuals television shows and news broadcasts in sign language. Subtitles in sign language are also increasing. On November 29, 2001, the first Bible was translated into Swedish Sign Language. Furthermore, the Health and Medical Service Act (1982) guaranteed interpreters for deaf and hard-of-hearing individuals in working life, leisure, and club activities.

See also
Signed Swedish

References

Further reading

External links 
 Swedish Sign Language Interpretation of Måns Zelmerlöw's Song "Heroes"
 Swedish Sign Language Alphabet
 Swedish vs American Sign Language Alphabet
 http://www.endangeredlanguages.com/lang/7359

Swedish Sign Language family
Articles containing video clips
Languages of Sweden